Alf Lied Aanning (10 February 1896 – 8 February 1948) was a Norwegian gymnast who competed in the 1920 Summer Olympics.

He was a member of the Norwegian team that won the silver medal in the men's gymnastics Free Systems and Apparatus event. He was born in Borgund, and represented the club Aalesunds TF.

References

External links
 

1896 births
1948 deaths
Sportspeople from Ålesund
Norwegian male artistic gymnasts
Gymnasts at the 1920 Summer Olympics
Olympic gymnasts of Norway
Olympic silver medalists for Norway
Olympic medalists in gymnastics
Medalists at the 1920 Summer Olympics
20th-century Norwegian people